Jurado is a surname. Notable people with the surname include:

 Álvaro Jurado (born 1981), football (soccer) player
 Antonio Torres Jurado (1817–1892), guitarist
 Ariel Jurado (born 1996), Panamanian professional baseball pitcher
 Carlos Jurado (born 1947), football (soccer) player
 Cristina Jurado (born 1972), Spanish writer and editor
 Damien Jurado, singer-songwriter
 Enrique M. Jurado (born 1976), jockey
 Fernando Jurado Noboa (born 1949), psychiatrist
 Jeanette Jurado (born 1965), singer
 Jorge Jurado (born 1995), actor
 José Jurado de la Parra (1856–1943), journalist
 José Jurado (1899–1971), golfer
 José Manuel Jurado (born 1986), football (soccer) player
 Juan Gómez-Jurado (born 1977), journalist and author
 Juan de Dios Jurado (born 1981), runner
 Katy Jurado (1924–2002), actress
 Rocío Jurado (1946–2006), singer and actress

See also
 Cortijo Jurado, mansion
 Juradó, town in Colombia